Benjamin Mwangata (born March 11, 1966) is a retired male boxer from Tanzania, who represented his native East African country as a flyweight in two consecutive Summer Olympics, starting in 1988 (Seoul). He also competed at two Commonwealth Games: 1990 and 1998. Mwangata won a silver medal in the flyweight division at the 1987 All-Africa Games, losing in the final to Gemelhu Bezabeh of Ethiopia.

References

External links
 Profile
 thecgf

1966 births
Living people
Tanzanian male boxers
Flyweight boxers
Boxers at the 1988 Summer Olympics
Boxers at the 1992 Summer Olympics
Boxers at the 1990 Commonwealth Games
Boxers at the 1998 Commonwealth Games
Olympic boxers of Tanzania
Commonwealth Games competitors for Tanzania
African Games silver medalists for Tanzania
African Games medalists in boxing
Competitors at the 1987 All-Africa Games